Le Pays Réel (French; literally "The Real Country") was a Catholic-Fascist newspaper published by the Rexist Party in Belgium. Its first issue appeared on 3 May 1936 and it continued to be published during the Second World War. It was briefly edited by Victor Matthys. While the Pays Réel remained the main paper of Rex, it remained just one of several published by the group, or subsumed under Rexist control, during the war.

The newspaper's title derives from the writings of Charles Maurras, a French nationalist, who distinguished between a pays réel, rooted in the realities of life such as locality, work, trades, the parish and the family, and a pays légal ("legal country") of law, constitutionalism, and liberal political ideals which he cast as artificially imposed on the "real".

See also
Belgium in World War II
German occupation of Belgium during World War II
Je suis partout

References

1936 establishments in Belgium
Belgian collaboration during World War II
Defunct newspapers published in Belgium
Fascist newspapers and magazines
French-language newspapers published in Belgium
Publications established in 1936